Stanley Albert Armitage (5 June 1919 – 4 November 1997) was an English footballer who played in the Football League for Queens Park Rangers.

References

External links
 

1919 births
1997 deaths
English footballers
English Football League players
Queens Park Rangers F.C. players
Ebbsfleet United F.C. players
Footballers from Woolwich
Association football forwards